This is the list of massacres of ethnic Armenians.

List

See also 
 Anti-Armenian sentiment
 List of massacres in Azerbaijan
 Massacres in the course of the Nagorno-Karabakh War

Notes

References